NGC 465 is an open cluster in the Magellanic Clouds. Being part of the Tucana constellation, it was discovered by Scottish astronomer James Dunlop in 1826.

References

External links 

0465
Tucana (constellation)
Open clusters